The Hazrat Pir Muhammad Shah Library is a library on Pir Muhammad Shah Road, Pankore Naka, Ahmedabad, in the state of Gujarat, India. One of the oldest libraries in India, it has a collection of rare original manuscripts in Arabic, Persian, Urdu, Sindhi and Turkish languages.

Introduction
The library is located within the precincts of the tomb-shrine complex of Pir Muhammad Shah, a Sufi who was born in Bijapur in 1688 and migrated to Ahmedabad in 1711, where he died in 1749.

Prominent writer and scholar Professor Mohyiuddin Bombaywala has held the post of director since last 30 years. Dr. Ziauddin A. Desai, the well-known numismatist and scholar, was associated with the Library and its governing trust until his death in 2002.

History
Pir Muhammad Shah was a Hussaini Sayyid and a well-respected Sufi who lived in Ahmedabad during the rule of Aurangzeb. His father died before his birth and his uncle, ‘Abd al-Rahman, trained the young Muhammad Shah in religious scholarship and practical Sufism. The Pir was a great lover of learning and possessed an extraordinary memory. During his lifetime, the Pir and his murids (disciples) had amassed a large collection of manuscripts and books of academic and spiritual value. These are housed in the "kutubkhana" (library). Pir Muhammad Shah was a bi-lingual poet himself and wrote profusely in Persian and Dakhani. Among his many works, the best known is Nur al-shuyukh in Persian which is a versified history in the mutaqarib meter.

Sunni Vohras of the Kadi jamat are also followers (murids) of Pir Muhammad Shah. Pir Muhammad Shah wrote five sujaras. Dargah sharif of Hazrat Pir Muhammad Shah is a well-known historical site where many go to visit the dargah and library.

The Pir Muhammad Shah trust has been supporting Muslim students right from primary school to graduation. The trust also manages a hostel for Muslim students who come to study in Ahmedabad from far places.

Catalogues
Arabi, Farsi, Urdu makhtūtāt kī wadahatī fihrist, 10 vols., (Ahmedabad: Pir Muhammad Shah Dargah Sharif Trust) 1998.
Shaykh Farid al-Din Burhanpuri, d. 1998, "Kutub khanah-yi Dargah Hazrat Pir Muhammad Shah," Nawa-i Adab (October 1955); Taher, Amin Ahmed Khan, and Muhammed Burhanuddin, "Dargah Libraries in India: A Comparative Study," International Library Journal 18 (1986): 337–345; Z. A. Desai, "Some Rare Seal-Bearing Persian Manuscripts in the Hazrat P. M. Dargah Library," Indo-Iranica 46, l-lv
(1993): 52–73.
Works on the history or individual manuscripts in the Library: published 6 journals. 12 catalogues.

References

Libraries in Gujarat
Education in Ahmedabad